Tonk district is a district of the state of Rajasthan in western India. The city of Tonk is the administrative headquarters of the district. The district is bounded on the north by Jaipur district, on the east by Sawai Madhopur district, on the southeast by Kota district, on the south by Bundi district, on the southwest by Bhilwara district, and on the west by Ajmer district.

History 
It was built in the 12th century by a Brahmin Tunkau, from whom it came to the be known as Tunk and later Tonk According to another version, the town was built by a Brahman called Bhola in 1643

Geography
Tonk is on National Highway 12, 100 km from Jaipur. It is in the northeastern part of the state between 75.19' and 76.16 East longitude and 25.41' and 26.24' North latitude. The total area is 7194 km2 (as per 2002-03).

It is one of the four districts headquarters of Rajasthan state that are not directly connected with rail. The nearest railway station, Newai, is within the district but is 30 km from the district headquarters. Banas River flows through the district.

The district is notable for the Tonk meteorite, a rare carbonaceous chondrite meteorite that fell in 1911.

Economy
In 2006, the Ministry of Panchayati Raj named Tonk one of the country's 250 most backward districts (out of 640). It is one of the 12 districts in Rajasthan receiving funds from the Backward Regions Grant Fund (BRGF).

Divisions
Tonk has 9 tehsils and 7 sub-divisions.
The 9 tehsils are Deoli, Malpura, Newai, Todaraisingh, Tonk, Peeplu, Uniara, Dooni and Nagarfort. 
The 7 sub-divisiobs are Deoli, Malpura, Newai, Todaraisingh, Tonk, Peeplu and Aligarh (Uniara). 
Tonk is Nagar-Parishad while Deoli, Malpura, Newai, Todaraisingh and Uniara are Nagar-Palikas. There were 1093 villages in the district according to the 2001 census.

Notable sights 

 Shahi Jama Masjid
 Bisalpur Dam
 Bisaldeo Temple
 Diggi Kalyan Ji Mandir
 Hadi Rani Ka Kund
 Hathi Bhata
 Rasiya Ke Tekri
 Shivaji Park
 Sunehri Kothi
Maulana Abul Kalam Azad Arabic and Persian Research Institute (APRI)

Culture

Notable personalities 

 Ajit Singh Mehta
 Banwari Lal Bairwa
 Masood Ahmed Barkati
 Gulubhai Jasdanwalla
 Karpoor Chandra Kulish
 Kailash Chandra Meghwal
 Chhavi Rajawat
 Jeet Ram
 Prabhu Lal Saini
 Hiralal Shastri
 Akhtar Sheerani
 Hafiz Mehmood Khan Shirani
 Wali Hasan Tonki
 Manikya Lal Verma
 khaleel Ahmad
Azeem Akhtar
 Irrfan Khan

Demographics

According to the 2011 census, Tonk district has a population of 1,421,326, roughly equal to the nation of Timor-Leste or the US state of Hawaii. This gives it a ranking of 347th in India (out of 640). Its population growth rate over the decade 2001-2011 was 17.33%. Tonk has a sex ratio of 949 females for every 1000 males and a literacy rate of 62.46%. 22.35% of the population lives in urban areas. Scheduled Castes and Scheduled Tribes make up 20.26% and 12.54% of the population respectively.

At the time of the 2011 Census of India, 39.83% of the population in the district spoke Dhundari, 28.58% Rajasthani, 26.71% Hindi and 3.81% Urdu as their first language.

References

External links

 Official site
 Tonk Industry
 Tonk
 Tonk district profile

 
Districts of Rajasthan
1818 establishments in India
Districts in Ajmer division